Richard or Dick Johnson may refer to:

Academics
 Dick Johnson (academic) (1929–2019), Australian academic
 Richard C. Johnson (1930–2003), professor of electrical engineering
 Richard A. Johnson, artist and professor at the University of New Orleans
 Richard Johnson, former director of the Birmingham Centre for Contemporary Cultural Studies

Arts and entertainment
 Richard Johnson (war artist) (born 1966), Canadian journalist and war artist
 Richard S. Johnson (artist) (born 1939), American painter
 Richard Johnson (actor) (1927–2015), English actor
 Richard Johnson (columnist), American gossip columnist
 Richard Johnson (director) (born 1974), American film director who founded Joystick Films in 2005
 Dick Johnson (clarinetist) (1925–2010), musician, played in the Artie Shaw band
 Richard Johnson (16th century) (1573–c. 1659), romance writer
 Richard B. Johnson (born 1943), Abominable Firebug author
 Richard Johnson (pianist) (born 1975), American composer, jazz pianist, and music professor
 Richard "Dick" Johnson, subject of the 2020 documentary Dick Johnson Is Dead 
 Dick Johnson, alias of the bandit Ramirez in Giacomo Puccini's La fanciulla del West

Aviation
 Dick Johnson (test pilot) (1917–2002), founding member of the Society of Experimental Test Pilots in 1955
 Dick Johnson (glider pilot) (1923–2008), glider pilot, aeronautical engineer and writer
 Richard Johnson, test-pilot of the X-4 Bantam

Law and politics
 Richard Mentor Johnson (1780–1850), American politician and 9th vice president of the United States
 Richard Johnson (mayor), American politician and city manager
 Richard Johnson (judge) (1937–2019), president of the High Court of Ireland
 Richard Z. Johnson (1837–1913), 2nd attorney general of the Idaho Territory

Sports
 Richard Johnson (cricketer, born 1829) (1829–1851), English cricketer
 Richard Johnson (cricketer, born 1974), English cricketer
 Richard Johnson (cricketer, born 1979), former English cricketer
 Richard Johnson (cricketer, born 1988), cricketer for Warwickshire County Cricket Club
 Richard Johnson (golfer) (born 1972), Welsh professional golfer
 Richard S. Johnson (golfer) (born 1976), Swedish professional golfer
 Richard Johnson (rugby) (born 1985), rugby league player for Bradford Bulls
 Dick Johnson (footballer) (1895–1933), English footballer
 Richard Johnson (soccer) (born 1974), Australian footballer
 Richard Johnson (defensive back) (born 1963), former NFL cornerback
 Richard Johnson (wide receiver) (born 1961), former NFL wide receiver
 Dick Johnson (racing driver) (born 1945), Australian racing driver
 Dick Johnson Racing, an Australian motor racing team
 Richard Johnson (jockey) (born 1977), British jockey
 Richard Fulke Johnson Houghton (born 1940), British racehorse trainer
 Butch Johnson (Richard Andrew Johnson, born 1955), American Olympic medalist in archery
 Rich Johnson (basketball) (1946–1994), American basketball player
 Dick Johnson (rugby league) (1916–1984), Australian rugby league player
 Dick Johnson (sailor) (1923–2005), sailor from United States Virgin Islands

Other
 Richard Johnson (chaplain) (c. 1753–1827), chaplain to first settlement in New South Wales
 Richard W. Johnson (1827–1897), Civil War general
 Richard Johnson (engineer) (1827–1924), British engineer, chief engineer to the Great Northern Railway
 Richard W. Johnson (oceanographer) (1929–2016), American oceanographer
 Richard T. Johnson (?–2015), Johns Hopkins neurologist
 Richard Johnson (architect) (born 1946), Australian architect
 Dick Johnson (reporter) (1953–2020), American television news anchor and reporter
 Richard Johnson (entrepreneur), founder of hotjobs.com
 Dick Johnson Township, Clay County, Indiana

See also
 Rich Johnson (disambiguation)
 Rick Johnson (disambiguation)